Till I Loved You may refer to:

 "Till I Loved You" (song), a 1989 song by Plácido Domingo and Jennifer Rush
 Till I Loved You (album), a 1989 album by Barbra Streisand
 "Til I Loved You", a 1986 song by Restless Heart

See also
 I Loved You (disambiguation)
 I Love You (disambiguation)